is a railway station in the city of Tsuruga, Fukui Prefecture, Japan, operated by West Japan Railway Company (JR West).

Lines

Station layout
The station consists of one side platform serving a single bi-directional track. There is no station building. The station is unattended.

History
Nishi-Tsuruga Station opened on 1 September 1962.  With the privatization of Japanese National Railways (JNR) on 1 April 1987, the station came under the control of JR West.

Passenger statistics
In fiscal 2016, the station was used by an average of 140 passengers daily (boarding passengers only).

Surrounding area
The station is located at the edge of a residential area
Fukui Prefecture Tsuruga Industrial High School

See also
 List of railway stations in Japan

References

External links

  

Railway stations in Fukui Prefecture
Stations of West Japan Railway Company
Railway stations in Japan opened in 1962
Obama Line
Tsuruga, Fukui